The Condition of the Working Class in England is an 1845 book by the German philosopher Friedrich Engels, a study of the industrial working class in Victorian England. Engels' first book, it was originally written in German as Die Lage der arbeitenden Klasse in England; an English translation was published in 1887. It was written during Engels' 1842–44 stay in Manchester, the city at the heart of the Industrial Revolution, and compiled from Engels' own observations and detailed contemporary reports.

After their second meeting in 1844, Karl Marx read and was profoundly impressed by the book.

Summary
In Condition, Engels argues that the Industrial Revolution made workers worse off. He shows, for example, that in large industrial cities such as Manchester and Liverpool, mortality from disease (such as smallpox, measles, scarlet fever and whooping cough) was four times that in the surrounding countryside, and mortality from convulsions was ten times as high. The overall death-rate in Manchester and Liverpool was significantly higher than the national average (1 in 32.72, 1 in 31.90 and even 1 in 29.90, compared with 1 in 45 or 46). An interesting example highlights the increase in the overall death-rates in the industrial town of Carlisle. Before the introduction of mills (1779–87), 4,408 out of 10,000 children died before age five, while after the introduction of mills, the figure rose to 4,738. Before the introduction of mills, 1,006 out of 10,000 adults died before reaching 39 years old; after their introduction, the death rate rose to 1,261 out of 10,000.

Engels' interpretation proved to be extremely influential with British historians of the Industrial Revolution. He focused on both the workers' wages and their living conditions. He argued that the industrial workers had lower incomes than their pre-industrial peers and they lived in more unhealthy and unpleasant environments. This proved to be a very wide-ranging critique of industrialization and one that was echoed by many of the Marxist historians who studied the industrial revolution in the 20th century.

Originally addressed to a German audience, the book is considered by many to be a classic account of the universal condition of the industrial working class during its time. The eldest son of a successful German textile industrialist, Engels became involved in radical journalism in his youth. Sent to England, what he saw there made him even more radical. 

In 1844, in Paris, Engels met and formed his lifelong intellectual partnership with Karl Marx. Engels showed Marx his book;  convincing Marx that the working class could be the agent and instrument of the final revolution in history.

The German original
In the original German edition he said:

English editions
The book was translated into English in 1885 by an American, Florence Kelley under her then-married name Florence Kelley Wischnewetzky. Authorised by Engels and with a newly written preface by him, it was published in 1887 in New York and in London in 1891. These English editions had the qualification in 1844 added to the English title.

Engels in his 1892 preface said:

The book has been continuously reissued, and remains in print in several different editions.

References

Further reading
 Steven Marcus, Engels, Manchester, and the Working Class. Piscataway, NJ: Transaction Publishers, 2015 [1974].

External links
 Condition of the Working Class in England in 1844 (Full text in HTML at the Marx/Engels Internet Archive)
 The Condition of the Working-Class in England (full text in PDF format published by Progress Publishers)
 A letter from Engels to Florence Kelley Wischnewetzky
 
 

Books about labour
Industrial Revolution in England
Working class in England
1844 in England
1845 non-fiction books
1887 non-fiction books
1845 in Europe
1887 in England
Books about capitalism
Communist books
History of Manchester
Political books
Working conditions
Poverty in England
Economic history of England
Political history of England
Social history of England
Oxford University Press books
Books about England
Friedrich Engels